George Island is a small island located within the north basin of Lake Winnipeg in the Canadian province of Manitoba. A lighthouse named George Island Light is located on the island. To the west of George Island lies Little George Island.

George Island is a popular stop-over because of its natural and sheltered harbour and the pristine sand beaches surrounding the island.

See also
Reindeer Island
Hecla Island
Spider Islands

Islands of Lake Winnipeg